The Audi Type C was introduced in 1912. It became popular with the German people and Army, being brought back into production for a couple of years after the war. Its performance, handling and reliability along with rally successes greatly raised Audi's profile, and the Type C was a commercial success. 1,116 cars were produced.

The Type C had a maximum speed of 90 km/h (56 mph).

From 1912 through to 1914, the Audi Type C completed the Austrian Alpine Rally, winning in these three successive years. The Austrian Alpine Rally was one of the most competitive motorsport endurance races at the time.

References

 

Type C
Cars introduced in 1912
1920s cars
Auto Union
Rear-wheel-drive vehicles